HMS M1 may refer to the following ships of the Royal Navy:

 , a monitor initially named M1
 , the first M-class submarine

See also
 , a Swedish Royal Navy M-type minesweeper; see List of mine warfare vessels of the Swedish Navy
 HSwMS Älvsnabben (M01) (1943), a Swedish Royal Navy minelayer

Royal Navy ship names